The MRC Weatherall Institute of Molecular Medicine at the University of Oxford is a research institute located at the John Radcliffe Hospital in Oxford. Founded in 1989 by Sir David Weatherall, the institute focuses on furthering our understanding of clinical medicine at a molecular level. It was one of the first institutes of its kind in the world to be dedicated to research in this area.

The MRC WIMM is part of the Medical Sciences Division at the University of Oxford. It hosts over 500 staff and students from seven different departments working on five key areas of research: immunology and infection, haematology, rare diseases, cancer biology, stem cells and developmental biology. The institute houses the MRC Human Immunology Unit, MRC Molecular Haematology Unit and MRC WIMM Centre for Computational Biology. A third of the researchers are clinically qualified and have joint posts with the departments at the Oxford University Hospitals NHS Foundation Trust.

Research
Several research breakthroughs have been made at the MRC WIMM.

 Researchers based at the WIMM discovered how cells and tissues recognise and respond to oxygen levels; work for which Sir Peter Ratcliffe was awarded the Nobel Prize in Medicine or Physiology in 2019. 
 Researchers there made key discoveries on how the HIV virus evades the immune system. 
 The institute has a long track record in genetics and researchers there uncovered the many of the molecular mechanisms underlying genetic disorders affecting haemoglobin production including alpha thalassaemia. It contributed to the human genome project and identified key genes and processes in a variety of human genetic diseases. 
 Scientists at the institute have defined novel mechanisms by which the immune system causes severe neurological diseases, which has led to new therapies.

MRC Molecular Haematology Unit
Originally founded in 1980, the MRC Molecular Haematology Unit (MRC MHU) is now situated in the MRC Weatherall Institute of Molecular Medicine. 14 research teams work within the unit to understand a variety of haematological processes. Over 100 researchers are studying projects including work on stem cells and how they mature into blood components such as red cells, granulocytes, lymphocytes and platelets. Research is also carried out to understand what happens when these processes are disrupted in diseases of the blood including leukaemia, myelodysplasia and thalassaemia.

The unit's research is integrated with NHS patient services through collaboration with the clinical Department of Haematology at Oxford University NHS Foundation Trust. Many of the researchers are also practicing clinicians and links with the Department of Haematology and Paediatrics at Oxford University provide access to clinical samples and help discoveries made at the unit to be effectively translated into improvements in medicine in clinics for patients.

MRC Human Immunology Unit
Founded in 1998, the MRC Human Immunology Unit (MRC HIU) focuses on researching fundamental and translational immunology. Research within the unit aims to increase our understanding of how the human immune system functions throughout life, particularly the response to infection and cancer.  Their work contributes to the development of treatments for cancer, autoimmune diseases and infections. The unit works in collaboration with the NHS and industry, along with charities, including Wellcome and Cancer Research UK.

During the COVID-19 pandemic of the 2020s, MRC HIU research several treatments for COVID-19 and SARS-CoV-2 infections, including therapeutics, and prophylactic vaccines. The HIU and the Pirbright Institute studied the Oxford RBD-SpyVLP vaccine, a virus-like particle (VLP)-based vaccine targeting the spike glycoprotein receptor-binding domain (RBD).

Directors
 Sir David Weatherall FRS 1989-2000
 Sir Andrew McMichael FRS 2000-2012
 Prof Doug Higgs FRS 2012-2020
 Prof KJ Patel FRS 2020-

Alumni

 Prof Charles Bangham (Chair of Immunology, Imperial College London)
 Sir John Bell FRS, (Regius Chair of Medicine, University of Oxford)
 Prof Roy Bicknell, (Professor of Functional Genomics, University of Birmingham)
 Prof Vincenzo Cerundolo (Previous Director of the MRC Human Immunology Unit, University of Oxford)
 Prof Paul Crocker FRSE, (Professor of Glycoimmunology, University of Dundee)
 Dame Kay Davies FRS, (Professor of Anatomy, University of Oxford)
 Sir Jeremy Farrar FRS, (Director of the Wellcome Trust)
 Prof Jonathan Frampton, (Professor of Stem Cell Biology, University of Birmingham)
 Prof Frances Gotch, (Emeritus Professor of Immunology, Imperial College London)
 Prof Ann Harris, (Professor of Paediatrics, Northwestern University)
 Prof Peter Harris, (Professor of Biochemistry and Molecular Biology, Mayo Clinic Rochester )
 Prof Chris Higgins, (Previous Vice Chancellor, Durham University)
 Prof Adrian Hill, (Director of the Jenner Institute, University of Oxford)
 Prof Anthony Monaco, (President of Tufts University)
 Prof Paul Moss, (Professor of Haematology, University of Birmingham)
 Sir Peter Ratcliffe FRS, (Nobel Prize winner, Professor of Clinical Medicine, University of Oxford)
 Prof Gavin Screaton, (Head of the Medical Sciences Division, University of Oxford)
 Prof Swee Lay Thein, (Chief of the Sickle Cell Branch of the National Heart, Lung, and Blood Institute, NIH)

References

External links
 Weatherall Institute of Molecular Medicine Website
 Medical Sciences Division website
 University of Oxford website

Educational institutions established in 1989
Research institutes in Oxford
Departments of the University of Oxford
1989 establishments in England